Building a Future (BAF) is an international, philanthropic nonprofit organization dedicated to improving the lives of impoverished children in Latin America. BAF currently operates in Tegucigalpa, Honduras.

History 
In December 2007, Building a Future became a 501(c)(3) nonprofit organization. BAF was started in 2004 by a group of Texas A&M University students. They were inspired to do something of social importance that would have an impact at an international level.

Jose Mahomar and Robert Furr (now BAF Directors) took a leap of faith by proposing a philanthropic idea that would seek to provide education to impoverished children in Honduras. The idea for BAF started in a class titled ‘Academy for Future International Leaders’ and then developed into an organized effort supported by Texas A&M University and is currently in process of forming a partnership with the Borlaug Institute. Jose and Robert decided to keep pursuing their vision and some of their closest friends at TAMU joined in.

Programs

Texaco Family Support Center 
Since January 2006, Building A Future (BAF) has served a community of over 500 children with the construction the Texaco Family Support Center. This was BAF's first project initiative and its success has confirmed the desire to create a bigger impact in other communities in Honduras.

In June 2008, BAF secured another additional donation from Chevron Texaco to provide educational material, such as a computer, a projector, and a photocopier, to the center.

Junior Master Gardener Program 
In February 2009, BAF in partnership with the Borlaug Institute at Texas A&M University will host the Junior Master Gardener Program.  This program includes curriculum which educates children with a special focus on agriculture and has the potential to be implemented at other educational facilities throughout Honduras as.

1,000 Children are in Need Campaign 
In July 2009, BAF began a campaign to keep eight family support centers in Tegucigalpa, Honduras from closing due to a lack of funding.  As a result of the political turmoil, the centers did not receive subsidies that they depend on to remain operational.  To prevent these centers from closing or reducing operations, BAF sought to raise at least US$12,000 to fill the gap.

Fun in the Park Event 
As part of this campaign, BAF plans to host a fundraising event in Coconut Grove's Kennedy Park near Miami, FL on August 15, 2009. The event will have food, games, and entertainment and in exchange for suggested donations to support the campaign.

References

External links 
 Official Building a Future website

Charities based in Texas
Development charities based in the United States
International volunteer organizations
Organizations established in 2007
Foreign charities operating in Honduras